Avant House is a historic house at 909 Sanford Road in Andalusia, Alabama. It was built by Frank Lockwood. It is listed on the National Register of Historic Places. It was refurbished by William W. Avant (1922-2011) in his retirement.

References

National Register of Historic Places in Covington County, Alabama
Neoclassical architecture in Alabama
Houses completed in 1914
Houses on the National Register of Historic Places in Alabama